Charles Medlam is an English conductor and cellist also known for his performances on viola da gamba.

Medlam studied the cello with Jane Cowan (1915-1996) in London, Paris, Vienna and Salzburg Mozarteum before becoming interested in the bass viol and early performing styles.

He studied with Maurice Gendron at the Paris Conservatoire, Wolfgang Herzer at Vienna, then studied cello with Heidi Litschauer and performance practice with Nikolaus Harnoncourt in Salzburg.

Charles Medlam founded London Baroque with Ingrid Seifert in 1978. He plays baroque music on a Perugian cello made by Finnocchi in about 1720 and later music on a Lorenzo Ventapane made in Naples in 1806.

As well as ensemble work, Medlam has begun to popularise and record the solo gamba music of composers such as Nicolas Hotman, Jean Lacquemant (Dubuisson), Sainte-Colombe and De Machy.  Medlam and his music are often heard on BBC Radio 3. His work has been favourably reviewed by BBC Radio 3, the Early Music journal and others.

Selected recordings
Marc-Antoine Charpentier, Sonate à huit H.548, Musique de théâtre pour "Andromède" H.504, Concert pour quatre parties de violes H.545, Musique de théâtre pour "Circé" H.496, London Baroque, basse de violon and conducting, Charles Medlam. CD Harmonia Mundi 1986 (HMC 901244)

References

English cellists
Living people
21st-century British conductors (music)
Year of birth missing (living people)
21st-century cellists